WRL can stand for different things:

 Wales Rugby League, governing body for rugby league football in Wales
 War Resisters League, a secular pacifist organization in the United States
 Web Rule Language, a W3C member submission
 Windows Runtime Library, also known as the Windows Runtime C++ Template Library, a programming library for accessing COM on Windows.
 Woodlands Regional Library, a regional library in Woodlands, Singapore
 Worland Municipal Airport (IATA airport code), a public airport in Wyoming, U.S.
 The World Racing League, a fictional automobile racing league in the Speed Racer film adaptation
 WRL (file extension), a VRML file format for representing 3D vector graphics